Vladimir Jašić (Serbian Cyrillic: Владимир Јашић; born 4 January 1984) is a Serbian footballer.

Playing career
Jašić began his career in 2002 in the First League of FR Yugoslavia with FK Borac Čačak. During his tenure with Čačak he was loaned to the Second League of FR Yugoslavia in 2003 with play with FK Remont Čačak. After several seasons with Borac he signed with FK ČSK Čelarevo in the Serbian First League. In 2008, he returned to the Serbian SuperLiga to play with FK Mladi Radnik. He went abroad in 2010 in order to play in the Albanian Superliga with KF Vllaznia Shkodër.

After a season in Albania he returned to Serbia to play with Javor Ivanjica, FK Voždovac, and Radnicki Kragujevac. In 2015, he went overseas to play in the Canadian Soccer League with London City. The following season he returned to Voždovac to play in the Prva Liga.

References

External links
 Profile at Srbijafudbal

1984 births
Living people
Serbian footballers
FK Borac Čačak players
FK Remont Čačak players
FK ČSK Čelarevo players
FK Mladi Radnik players
FK Voždovac players
FK Javor Ivanjica players
FK Radnički 1923 players
Serbian SuperLiga players
Association football defenders
Serbian expatriate footballers
Expatriate footballers in Albania
Serbian expatriate sportspeople in Albania
Expatriate soccer players in Canada
Serbian expatriate sportspeople in Canada
London City players
Canadian Soccer League (1998–present) players
KF Vllaznia Shkodër players
Kategoria Superiore players